The super welterweight (or light middleweight) division in MMA sits between the welterweight division and the middleweight division. It was approved by the Association of Boxing Commissions on July 26, 2017.

References

Mixed martial arts weight classes